Edward LeMaire (October 26, 1924 – February 15, 1961) was an American figure skater who competed in pairs and men's singles.  In pairs, he won the junior title at the United States Figure Skating Championships in 1942 and won a bronze medal in senior pairs the following year with Dorothy Goos.  Also in 1943, he captured the junior men's national title.

Away from the ice, LeMaire attended Yale University and the University of Nevada.  He was also a Navy pilot during World War II.

Later in his life, he was a skating judge.  He was en route to the World Figure Skating Championships in 1961 when his plane (Sabena Flight 548) crashed near Brussels, Belgium, killing all on board.  LeMaire was 36 at the time of his death.  His 14-year-old son Richard was also killed in the crash.

Results
men's singles

pairs with Goos

External links
 U.S. Figure Skating biography

American male pair skaters
American male single skaters
1924 births
1961 deaths
Victims of aviation accidents or incidents in Belgium
United States Navy personnel of World War II
Yale University alumni
University of Nevada alumni
Victims of aviation accidents or incidents in 1961